The Pulai Springs Malaysian Masters was a golf tournament on the Asian Tour that was held at the Pulai Springs Resort in Johor, Malaysia. It was played only once, in 2006, and was won by South African Anton Haig. The tournament was scheduled to return in 2007, but it was later removed from the tour schedule.

Winners

See also
Malaysian Dunlop Masters
Malaysian Masters
Volvo Masters of Malaysia

References

Former Asian Tour events
Golf tournaments in Malaysia
Iskandar Puteri
Recurring sporting events established in 2006
Recurring sporting events disestablished in 2006